Šentviška Gora ( or , in order sources Svetoviška Gora) is the main settlement in the hills between the valleys of the Bača and Idrijca rivers, known as the  or Šentviška Gora Plateau (Šentviškogorska planota), in the Municipality of Tolmin in the Littoral region of Slovenia.

Church

The parish church, from which the settlement and the entire plateau gets its name, is dedicated to Saint Vitus and belongs to the Koper Diocese.
It was first mentioned as the seat of the parish in documents dating to 1192, although the current building is Baroque in style. Its interior was painted in the early 20th century by Tone Kralj.

Notable people

Although he was probably born in Ribnica in southern Slovenia, a Slovene folk tradition claims Šentviška Gora as the birthplace of the composer Jacobus Gallus.

References

External links

Šentviška Gora on Geopedia

Populated places in the Municipality of Tolmin